Chalky Island or Te Kākahu-o-Tamatea is an island in the southwest of New Zealand, and is part of Fiordland National Park.

The island was known to Māori as te kākahu-o-Tamatea (the cloak of Tamatea), as, according to oral tradition, it was the place where the explorer Tamatea spread his cloak out to dry after being drenched by the sea. It was first charted by Captain James Cook in 1773, and was a base for sealers in the late 18th and early 19th centuries.

In 1999 Chalky Island became the first nearshore island from which stoats were successfully eradicated by the New Zealand Department of Conservation, and it is now free of mammalian predators and is used as a bird sanctuary. Until 2005 it was one of only four refuges of the only flightless native parrot, the critically endangered kākāpō, and is still a kākāpō refuge. Other threatened endemic birds transferred to the island since the eradication of stoats include tieke (saddleback), mōhua (yellowhead), little spotted kiwi, and orange-fronted kākāriki. The Te Kakahu skink is endemic to the island. Dolphins, orcas, and southern right whales are sometimes seen in the bay.

Chalky Island is one of the predator-free islands that is part of the Fiordland Islands restoration programme. The programme's focus is to eradicate pests and translocate native species.

Kākāpō 
In 2003, the last five kākāpō held on Maud island were transferred to Chalky Island. The group was composed of four male kākāpō and one female.

Several kākāpō were translocated to Chalky Island in 2003 by the New Zealand Department of Conservation. Kākāpō were held on the island for three years until stoat eradication on nearby Anchor Island could be completed.

Eight female kākāpō were transferred from Chalky Island to Codfish Island / Whenua Hou in July 2004.  All kākāpō on Chalky island and Pearl Island were later  translocated to Anchor Island from June to September 2005, after stoats were eradicated from Anchor Island.

Male kākāpō were reintroduced to the island by the Kākāpō Recovery Team in 2010. Female kākāpō were later introduced in May 2020 to join the 16 males already there.

See also

 New Zealand outlying islands
 List of islands of New Zealand
 List of islands
 Desert island

References

Uninhabited islands of New Zealand
Island restoration
Islands of Fiordland
Fiordland National Park